The Port of 40 Thieves is a 1944 American crime film directed by John English, written by Dane Lussier, and starring Stephanie Bachelor, Tom Keene, Lynne Roberts, Olive Blakeney, Russell Hicks and George Meeker. The film was released on August 13, 1944, by Republic Pictures.

Plot

Cast  
Stephanie Bachelor as Muriel Chaney
Tom Keene as Scott Barton (billed as Richard Powers)
Lynne Roberts as Nancy Hubbard Chaney (billed as Lynn Roberts)
Olive Blakeney as Aunt Caroline Hubbard
Russell Hicks as Charles Farrington
George Meeker as Frederick St. Clair
Mary Field as Della
Ellen Lowe as Miss Jones
Patricia Knox as Gladys Burns
John Hamilton as Mr. Fellows
Harry Depp as Train Conductor

References

External links 
 

1944 films
American crime films
1944 crime films
Republic Pictures films
Films directed by John English
American black-and-white films
1940s English-language films
1940s American films